This is a list of ambassadors and high commissioners of Ghana to individual sovereign nations of the world, states with limited recognition, and to international organizations. High Commissioners represent diplomatic missions in member states of the Commonwealth of Nations and Ambassadors represent diplomatic missions in other states. The head of a diplomatic mission to an international organization is called a Permanent Representative.

Where a diplomat is accredited to more than one nation, the first country listed is the location of the Ambassador's or High Commissioner's residence, followed by other countries of accreditation, in alphabetical order.

Current Ambassadors and High Commissioners

Permanent representatives to international organizations

Ambassadors-at-Large

See also
List of diplomatic missions of Ghana
List of diplomatic missions in Ghana
Foreign relations of Ghana

Notes
: The High Commission of Ghana to Australia is also accredited to New Zealand, Fiji, Papua New Guinea, Solomon Islands, Samoa, Kiribati, Nauru, Vanuatu and Tonga.
: The Ghana Embassy in Belgium serves as the Embassy to Luxembourg as well as the European Union
:The Ambassador Extraordinary and Plenipotentiary of Ghana to the Republic of Brazil has concurrent accreditation to Argentina, Bolivia, Chile, Colombia, Ecuador, French Guiana, Guyana, Paraguay, Peru, Suriname, Uruguay and Venezuela.
:The Embassy of the Republic of Ghana in China is also accredited to the Democratic Republic of the Congo.
:The Ghana Embassy in the Czech Republic has concurrent accreditation to the Slovakia, Hungary, Romania and North Macedonia.
:The Ghana Embassy in Egypt is accredited to Cyprus.
:The Ghana Embassy in Saudi Arabia is also covers United Arab Emirates, Bahrain, Qatar, Oman, Kuwait, Jordan, Yemen, and Syria.
:The Ghana High Commission in South Africa also covers Lesotho, Eswatini, Mauritius, Madagascar and Comoros and Seychelles.
:The Ghana High Commission in the United Kingdom of Great Britain and Ireland provides consular services for Ireland.
:The Ghanaian High Commission in Zimbabwe provides consular services for Comoros and Mozambique.

References

External links
The Permanent Mission of Ghana to the United Nations
Ghana Mission to European Union, Belgium and Luxembourg

Ghana
Ghana